Out Of Our Minds is the second solo album from Melissa Auf der Maur released on March 30, 2010.

Released six years after her self-titled debut, the album was also accompanied by a feature film and comic of the same name. According to reports, the album had been completed since 2007.

Background and production
In a 2007 interview with Billboard magazine, Melissa Auf der Maur confirmed she had completed her second solo album which was "part of a multidisciplinary Viking-themed project that includes a short film and comic book." It was also mentioned that guest musicians, such as Ryan Adams, Vince Nudo and ex-Tinker member Steve Durand, who had also written songs for and played guitar on Auf der Maur, would also appear on the album. Glenn Danzig confirmed on August 18, 2008 that he had recorded a song titled "Father's Grave" with Auf der Maur and claimed it would be included "on a track for her new CD." In the three years it took her to record the album, Auf der Maur also stated that there were "many stops and starts while I was exploring alternative creative outlets." "I was the only one there for the whole five years. I had 12 studios, 25 musicians, and 7 engineers but it wasn't like anyone was with me for the journey", she told Kerrang! in May 2010. Asked about inspirations for the album, she said: 

A website, xMAdMx.com, containing teasers of the projects, as well as a movie trailer, was launched in August 2007. On November 11, 2008, MAdM released her first EP, "This Would Be Paradise" through her official website, and as well digitally on iTunes. The EP was also released as a 7" vinyl edition, while the download package includes the album art and the three songs, "The Key", "Willing Enabler" and "...This Would Be Paradise." Less than a year later, on November 9, 2009, MAdM released the first single from the album, the title track "Out Of Our Minds" for free digital download on her website. On December 7, 2009, MAdM's second EP, also titled OOOM, was released. The three song EP, which includes "Out Of Our Minds", "Lead Horse" and "22 Below", was released in three different forms. The first was a digital download package which also included the CD and 7" version, the second included the same with an OOOM T-shirt, and the third "deluxe" version included a signed copy of the OOOM comic book. On January 12, 2010, the "Out Of Our Minds" music video was also premiered on her website.

MAdM has confirmed that all demos from the album were recorded on a 4-track with the help of a drum machine. The demos were recorded in northern Ontario with producer, Jordon Zadorozny. In February 2010, MAdM also confirmed that Out Of Our Minds will contain 12 tracks, and noted guest musicians such as "members of NIN, Helmet/Battles and Priestess."

On March 11, 2010, MAdM issued a newsletter confirming that Out Of Our Minds is set for release on March 30. It is also mentioned that "there are various international album releases" but that deluxe versions of the album will be "release[d] on my personal site." On March 28, another newsletter contained details on OOOMs release, and included links to a "secret OOOM page", which includes deluxe versions of the album for purchase, as well as a complete download of the album.

On October 4, 2010, Melissa Auf der Maur premiered her next music video "Meet Me On The Dark Side" online.

Promotion
{{Album ratings
| rev1 = AllMusic
| rev1Score = 
| rev2 = Kerrang!
| rev2Score= <ref name="kerrang!">Travers, Paul. Kerrang! #1310, May 01 2010. Albums. Former Hole bassist reinvents herself on second solo outing. p. 50.</ref>
| rev3 = NME
| rev3Score= 
| rev4 = Popmatters
| rev4Score= 
| rev5 = Consequence of Sound
| rev5Score= {Favorable}
}}
In efforts to promote the album, MAdM has performed various shows since 2008 and has performed alongside screenings of the OOOM film. Her first performance since 2004 was at Lion d'Or in Montréal on November 1, 2008 in which she debuted songs from Out Of Our Minds as well as confirmed the upcoming album.

More shows were performed in Utrecht and Helsinki the same month. More recently, MAdM has appeared at New York City's Knitting Factory on October 17, 2009. MAdM also performed at SPINs annual SXSW music festival in March, sharing the stage with Motörhead, and plans to tour Europe and United Kingdom in April, 2010.

The album charted and peaked at #174 in France, #36 in Greece and #52 in Switzerland.

Accolades
Year-end rankings

Decade-end rankings

Track listing

Personnel
All personnel credits adapted from Out of Our Minds'' liner notes.

Performers
Melissa Auf der Maur – vocals , bass , guitar , keys , autoharp , omnichord , tweaks 
Jordon Zadorozny – guitar , additional guitar , bass , keys , ebow 
Steve Durand – guitar , additional guitar , keys 
Chris Sorensen – guitar , keys , tweaks 
Chris Goss – guitar , additional guitar 
Vince Nudo – drums , additional guitar 
Adam Tymn – guitar , keys 
Joe McChan – drums 
Josh Freese – drums 
John Stainer – drums 
Colin Robins – drums 
Mike Garson – piano 
Camila Grey – harpsichord 
Mike Britton – trombone 

Guest performers
James Iha – ebow 
Glenn Danzig – vocals 
Jeordie White – additional guitar 
Ariel Engle – additional vocals 

Technical personnel
Melissa Auf der Maur – production 
Jordon Zadorozny – production , engineering 
Chris Goss – production 
Edmund P. Monsef – engineering , mixing 
Eli Janney – engineering , mixing 
Mike Fraser – mixing 
Alan Moulder – mixing 
Adam Ayan – mastering
Chris Rakestraw – additional engineering
George Pelekoudis – additional engineering
Paul Antonell – additional engineering
Eli Walker – assistant engineering
Matt Gunther – assistant engineering
Rudyard Lee Cullers – assistant engineering

Design personnel
Vincent Toi – art direction
Melissa Auf der Maur – creative collaboration
Phoebe Greenberg – creative collaboration
Reneta Morales – creative collaboration
George Fok – creative collaboration, photography

Chart positions

References

External links

2010 albums
Albums produced by Chris Goss
Albums produced by Melissa Auf der Maur
Melissa Auf der Maur albums
Roadrunner Records albums
Self-released albums